The fixture between Ferencvárosi TC and Újpest FC is a local derby in Budapest, Hungary and a fierce rivalry. The two clubs are the most popular clubs in the country and two of the most successful ones.

History and rivalry culture

The first match between Ferencváros and Újpest was played on 19 February 1905 at the Sorkosári úti Stadion in the 1905 Hungarian League season. The match ended with a 2-0 victory for the Ferencváros. The two goals were scored by Ferenc Weisz. The return match was also won by Ferencváros 3-1. The first and only Újpest goal was scored by Béla Petz.

The rivalry can be traced back to the 1930s when Újpest won their first Hungarian League title. The city of Újpest became part of Budapest only in the 1950s. Therefore, the rivalry is based on a city-rural contrast. The supporters of Ferencváros were Germans in Hungary and city-dwellers, while the supporters of Újpest were Hungarians, Germans, and Jews in Hungary. In the 1950s Ferencváros became the team of the opposition, while Újpest were forced to become the team of the Ministry of Interior. Therefore, Ferencváros fans consider Újpest as the Soviet invaders.

Both clubs are named after the areas in the city they play in, Ferencváros play in the 9th district Ferencváros just south of the city centre. Újpest play in the 4th district of Újpest to the north of the city. Traditionally MTK were Ferencváros main rival with both clubs dominating early Hungarian football. Once Újpest turned professional in the mid-1920s they became a successful side (totally dominating the league in the 1930s and 1970s).

On the day of the match police have to defend the public from the aggressive supporters of the two clubs. Therefore, the Line 3 of the Budapest Metro is controlled by the police and special carriages are provided before and after the match. The purple-white supporters of the Újpest FC get on at the Újpest-Központ metro station which is the closest metro station to the Szusza Ferenc Stadium. They get off at the Népliget metro station which is next to the Albert Stadion. The journey usually ends up in aggression and vandalism caused by the police and exaggerated by the media.

On 4 April 2015, the ultras of both sides announced their boycott on the 2014–15 Hungarian League derby at the Groupama Arena.

Before the 2014–15 Hungarian League Ferencváros-Újpest match the mayor of Újpest, Zsolt Wintermantel said that "without spectators there is no derby". Wintermantel also signed the letter which announces that Újpest fans do not attand the derby due to the regulations at the entrance of the newly built Groupama Arena.

Hooliganism
In the 2012-13 season Ferencváros hosted Újpest. Before the match there was a big fight between the Újpest supporters and the police at the Újpest-Központ.

In the 2013-14 season, after the derby the police had to use tear-gas to dissipate the Újpest fans at the Szusza ferenc Stadium.

Similarity
The rivalry between Ferencváros and Újpest is very similar to the rivalry between SK Rapid Wien and FK Austria Wien. Both Ferencváros and Rapid Wien use the green-white colors, while both Újpest and Austria Wien use the purple-white colors.

Fans
Besides the district of Ferencváros Ferencvárosi TC have a large fan base in the countryside, while the fans of Újpest FC are mainly based in the fourth district of Budapest that is Újpest and other parts of Budapest as well.

All time league results

Nemzeti Bajnokság I (1905 – present)

Source:

Statistics
As of 5 February 2023.

Head-to-head ranking in NBI

• Total: Ferencváros 29 times higher, Újpest 25 times higher.

In the Magyar Kupa Finals
Ferencváros and Újpest met only twice in the final of the Magyar Kupa. The first encounter took place in the 1932-33 Magyar Kupa Final. Ferencváros beat Újpest by a record of 11-1 at the Hungária körúti stadion. The second encounter took place at the Groupama Arena.

Players who played for both clubs

See also
 Derby of Budapest
 Ferencvárosi TC
 Újpest FC
 Örökrangadó

References

Football derbies in Hungary
Ferencvárosi TC
Újpest FC
Sport in Budapest